Mill Creek is an unincorporated community in New Castle County, Delaware, United States. Mill Creek is located along Valley Road, southwest of Hockessin.

References 

Unincorporated communities in New Castle County, Delaware
Unincorporated communities in Delaware